Banner Mills is an unincorporated community in Howard Township, Parke County, in the U.S. state of Indiana.

History
A post office was established at Banner Mills in 1855, and remained in operation until it was discontinued in 1863.

Geography

References

Unincorporated communities in Parke County, Indiana
Unincorporated communities in Indiana